Mark James Harper (born 26 February 1970) is a British politician who has served as Secretary of State for Transport since 2022. A  member of the Conservative Party, he has been Member of Parliament (MP) for Forest of Dean since 2005.

Harper was born in Swindon and studied Philosophy, Politics and Economics at Brasenose College, Oxford. He was a chartered accountant before his election to Parliament. Under the coalition government of David Cameron he served as Parliamentary Secretary for Political and Constitutional Reform before being promoted to Minister of State for Immigration in the 2012 reshuffle. During his tenure at the Home Office, he devised the controversial campaign in which advertising vans told illegal migrants to "go home". He resigned as Immigration Minister amid a scandal in February 2014, but quickly returned to government as Minister of State for Disabled People in the July 2014 reshuffle.

Harper was promoted to Cameron's Cabinet as Chief Whip of the House of Commons following the 2015 general election; he served in the role for a year before being sacked by incoming Prime Minister Theresa May in 2016. Harper was a candidate for Leader of the Conservative Party in the 2019 leadership contest, finishing 9th out of 10 candidates with 10 votes. During the Johnson premiership, he was the chair of the COVID Recovery Group of Conservative MPs advocating for looser COVID-19 restrictions. After Rishi Sunak became Prime Minister, Harper was appointed to the Cabinet as Secretary of State for Transport.

Education and career before politics
Harper was born and raised in Swindon, Wiltshire, where he had a working class upbringing, his father a manual worker and his mother employed by a book club. He was educated at the Headlands Comprehensive School and Swindon College. He read Philosophy, Politics and Economics at Brasenose College, Oxford where he studied under Professor Vernon Bogdanor.

Upon graduation in 1991, Harper joined KPMG as an auditor. After qualifying as a chartered accountant, he joined Intel Corporation. In 2002, he left Intel to set up his own accountancy practice.

Election to Westminster
Prior to entering Parliament, Harper was the treasurer of the Swindon Conservative Association and served as vice-chairman for a year in 1998.

He contested the Gloucestershire seat of Forest of Dean at the 2001 general election, but was defeated by the sitting Labour MP Diana Organ. Organ retired at the 2005 general election and Harper gained the seat for the Conservatives with a majority of 2,049 votes, which was the same number of votes by which he was defeated at the previous election. At the same general election, Harper's wife, Margaret, stood for election as the Conservative candidate in Worcester, where she finished in second place to the Labour candidate, Michael Foster.

Over subsequent elections Harper increased his majority; winning the 2019 general election with a majority of 16,000, having received 60% of votes cast.

Parliamentary career
On 24 May 2005, Harper made his maiden speech, in which he advocated giving the parents of children with special educational needs the option of sending their children to a non-mainstream school – an issue of local interest in Harper's Gloucestershire seat and one close to the heart of the then Shadow Education Secretary, David Cameron, whose son Ivan was born with severe learning difficulties. When Cameron was elected leader of the party in December 2005, he made Harper a spokesman on armed forces welfare issues and veterans.

Harper has sat on the Commons Administration Committee and briefly on the Work and Pensions Committee. On matters of foreign policy, he has consistently voted in support of British military intervention overseas. Harper was described in 2015 as a Eurosceptic. Even so, he campaigned to remain in the European Union during the 2016 referendum on ending the UK's membership.

The scandal over MPs' expenses showed Harper to be a frugal parliamentarian: his only significant expenses claim was for a brief period of temporary accommodation occupied on a short-term basis soon after being elected in 2005.

In the reshuffle of July 2007, Harper was made Shadow Minister for Disabled People – a position he held until the general election in 2010.

Junior Minister at the Cabinet Office

Soon after the general election in 2010, Harper became Parliamentary Secretary for Political and Constitutional Reform. There he worked with Deputy Prime Minister Nick Clegg on the Parliamentary Voting System and Constituencies Act 2011 that would offer the electorate a switch from 'first-past-the-post' to the Alternative Vote system for electing MPs (Harper was not enthusiastic about the proposal, which had been a key bargaining chip in the Coalition negotiations in May 2010). The Act also aimed to change the shapes of parliamentary constituencies and introduce fixed-term parliaments. On 5 May 2011, the referendum was held and voters rejected the proposed switch to the Alternative Vote system. Fixed-term parliaments became law later that year in a separate Act but the changes to constituency boundaries, which would have been advantageous to the Conservatives, never materialised.

In October 2010, the Government introduced the Public Bodies Bill to the House of Lords, which would allow it to sell or lease public forests in England. Harper defended the proposals, describing them as an "exciting opportunity for community ownership." However, they were widely criticised by many residents within his Forest of Dean constituency and by politicians with connections to the large oak forest after which Harper's parliamentary seat is named – including Baroness Jan Royall, Leader of the Opposition in the House of Lords. Following a public meeting – after which Harper had to be rescued by the police from what he described as "a baying mob" – and a sustained national campaign which included the newly formed local Forest of Dean pressure group Hands off our Forest, the government announced it had abandoned its plans and would remove the forestry clauses from the Public Bodies Bill.

Harper worked on the House of Lords Reform Bill, which set out to introduce a smaller second chamber consisting mostly of elected peers. This was a Liberal Democrat policy that had also been mentioned as an aspiration in the Conservative Party's manifesto of 2010. In July 2012, 91 Conservative MPs defied the whips and voted with Labour against the proposals, something which led the Coalition Government to abandon the planned reform soon afterwards.

Immigration Minister
In the reshuffle of September 2012, Harper was promoted to Minister of State for Immigration at a time when levels of inward migration were falling but emigration rates were falling faster still, leading to a rise in net migration into the UK.

Over the summer of 2013, Harper trialled a campaign aimed at illegal immigrants that consisted, in part, of lorries with hoardings attached to their load areas driving around London displaying the sign "Here Illegally? Go Home or Risk Arrest" with more information in smaller print on how to contact the Home Office for advice. The scheme was seen as offensive by some and it divided opinion within the Coalition's ministerial team. In October 2013, Harper told MPs: "The advertising vans in particular were too much of a blunt instrument and will not be used again". As immigration minister, Harper stated "British citizenship is a privilege, not a right".

Harper resigned as immigration minister on 8 February 2014, after he discovered that his self-employed cleaner did not have permission to work in the UK. In his resignation letter, Harper stated that he first made checks on his cleaner in 2007 and "considered the issue again" when appointed a minister in the Cabinet Office in 2010 and immigration minister in September 2012 but had concluded that "no further check was necessary". After launching a campaign to get employers and landlords to carry out "reasonable checks" on workers, Harper said that he thought it prudent to check the documents again, but could not locate them, and asked his cleaner for new copies. When his private office checked the details with immigration officials, it was found she did not have indefinite leave to stay in the UK. He immediately told Home Secretary Theresa May, and then after notifying Prime Minister David Cameron, he resigned. He was replaced by James Brokenshire.

Minister for Disabled People

The ministerial reshuffle in July 2014 saw Harper restored to office in the role of Minister of State for Disabled People at the Department for Work and Pensions (DWP). He took over responsibility for the relatively new Personal Independence Payment (PIP), as well as for the dysfunctional Work Capability Assessment (WCA) used to assess entitlement to Employment and Support Allowance (ESA) – a legacy of New Labour. Both operations were plagued by large backlogs of unassessed claims.

In October of that year, the Office for Budget Responsibility disclosed that Harper's department had failed to make the anticipated £3 billion annual saving in incapacity benefits spending expected by 2014 (the DWP achieved no saving at all from this budget over the whole of the 2010–15 parliamentary term).

In December 2014, Steve Parry-Hearn, a prospective Labour parliamentary candidate, accused Harper of hypocrisy when he called for businesses to improve disabled access; even though his own high street constituency office was inaccessible to wheelchair-users.

In January 2015, Harper appeared before the Work and Pensions Select Committee to face questions over the problems with PIP. A former senior civil servant appointed by the DWP to review PIP had found the scheme beset by "delays and backlogs" and had described the process, which was introduced by another minister in April 2013, as still representing "a major delivery challenge." Macmillan benefits advisers had told the reviewer that people had died while waiting for their PIP claim to be processed. The MS Society described these delays as unacceptable and some charities called for the PIP scheme to be halted.

In February 2015, Harper was interviewed by the BBC about David Cameron's request to Professor Dame Carol Black that she advise him on whether withholding ESA claimants' benefits if they were obese or addicted to alcohol or drugs would encourage them to undergo further treatment. Harper described this approach as "a very sensible move on the part of the Prime Minister". The idea met resistance from the medical profession and nothing came of it.

In March 2015, the US firm Maximus began carrying out WCAs in place of Atos under a completely new contract that would cost almost £600 million and run until late 2018. There was initial optimism within Whitehall that a new contract and a new provider would mean the start of a new chapter in fit-for-work assessment, although two House of Commons select committees – the Work and Pensions Committee and the Public Accounts Committee – had between them concluded that the DWP's policies, its operational decisions and its failure to monitor Atos adequately were to blame for many of the assessment's earlier failings. A review by the National Audit Office of the performance of the new contract in its first year was sceptical about its value for money, although the WCA backlog had been virtually eliminated by the spring of 2016.

By the time he left the DWP, Harper had brought about a substantial reduction in the size of the backlog of PIP claims as well. This was achieved by: drafting in hundreds more DWP decision-makers; assessing more claims on the basis of the documents supplied by claimants, rather than through more time-consuming face-to-face assessments; changing the way that waiting times were measured; and streamlining the whole end-to-end process.

Government Chief Whip
Harper was promoted to Chief Whip after the Conservative general election victory in May 2015.

In December 2015, after a vote in favour of using Britain's military capabilities against the Islamic State in Syria, the London Evening Standard reported that: "David Cameron dashed to the Government whips' office to congratulate Chief Whip Mark Harper following the Commons vote on the war, which saw MPs back action after a 10-hour debate".

Backbench MP
Following David Cameron's resignation and the ascension of Theresa May to the Prime Ministership, May dismissed Harper from cabinet and he returned to the backbenches.

During the COVID-19 pandemic, Harper was a critic of the government's approach. In November 2020, he became chair of the COVID Recovery Group, a group of MPs who advocated against lockdown and for looser restrictions.

In April 2022, Harper submitted a letter of no confidence in the Prime Minister Boris Johnson, in the wake of the Partygate scandal. Harper said that Johnson was now "no longer worthy" of remaining Prime Minister.

Honours
He was sworn in as a member of Her Majesty's Most Honourable Privy Council on 13 May 2015. This gave him the Honorific Prefix "The Right Honourable" for Life.

Secretary of State for Transport (2022–)
Upon the ascension of Rishi Sunak to the Prime Ministership, Harper made a return to the frontbench when he was appointed Secretary of State for Transport.

References

External links
 Mark Harper MP official constituency website
 Profile at the Conservative Party

 Forest of Dean Conservatives
 

|-

|-

|-

|-

|-

|-

|-

|-

1970 births
Living people
Alumni of Brasenose College, Oxford
Conservative Party (UK) MPs for English constituencies
English accountants
KPMG people
Secretaries of State for Transport (UK)
Members of the Privy Council of the United Kingdom
People from Swindon
UK MPs 2005–2010
UK MPs 2010–2015
UK MPs 2015–2017
UK MPs 2017–2019
UK MPs 2019–present